The West Indies women's cricket team toured England to play the England women's cricket team in September 2020. The tour consisted of five Women's Twenty20 International (WT20I) matches. The England and Wales Cricket Board (ECB) confirmed the fixtures,  after the planned tour by the South African women's team was cancelled due to the COVID-19 pandemic. All of the matches were played behind closed doors at the County Cricket Ground in Derby.

The last time the two teams played a match was against each other in the 2020 ICC Women's T20 World Cup on 1 March 2020. England won the match by 46 runs. The tour was the first women's bilateral series to use the Decision Review System (DRS) in all the matches. The third match of the series, on 26 September 2020, was shown free-to-air on the BBC. It was the first time a women's cricket match was shown live on the BBC in the United Kingdom since the 1993 Women's Cricket World Cup.

On 26 August 2020, Cricket West Indies named their squad for the tour. The West Indies team left Antigua on 30 August 2020, and arrived in England the following day. England won the first two matches by the same margin of 47 runs. They then won the third match by 20 runs, to take an unassailable lead in the series. England won the final two matches to take the series 5–0, the first time the England Women's cricket team had won a bilateral series 5–0.

Squads

Bryony Smith and Linsey Smith were named as standby players for the England team.

WT20I series

1st WT20I

2nd WT20I

3rd WT20I

4th WT20I

5th WT20I

References

External links
 Series home at ESPN Cricinfo

Women's cricket tours of England
2020 in West Indian cricket
2020 in English cricket
International cricket competitions in 2020
England 2020
cricket
2020 in women's cricket